Benito de Rivas, O.S.B. (died  August 21, 1668) was a Roman Catholic prelate who served as the Bishop of Puerto Rico (1663–1668).

Biography
Benito de Rivas was born in Madrid, Spain and ordained a priest in the Order of Saint Benedict. On February 28, 1663, he was appointed by the King of Spain and confirmed by Pope Alexander VII as Bishop of Puerto Rico. On February 24, 1664, he was consecrated bishop by Georges d’Aubusson de la Feuillade, Archbishop of Embrun with Antonio del Buffalo, Auxiliary Bishop of Toledo, and Luis de Morales, Auxiliary Bishop of Toledo as Co-Consecrators. He served as Bishop of Puerto Rico until his death on August 21, 1668. While bishop, he was the principal Consecrator of Francisco de la Cueva Maldonado, Archbishop of Santo Domingo.

References

External links and additional sources
 (for Chronology of Bishops) 
 (for Chronology of Bishops) 

1668 deaths
Bishops appointed by Pope Alexander VII
Benedictine bishops
17th-century Roman Catholic bishops in Puerto Rico